Chu Yun-han (3 February 1956 – 5 February 2023) was a Taiwanese political scholar, and an academician of the Academia Sinica.

Biography
Chu was born in Taipei, Taiwan, on 3 February 1956, while his ancestral home is in Zhuji, Zhejiang. He attended the Secondary School Affiliated with National Taiwan Normal University. After completing his master's degree in political science from National Taiwan University in 1979, he entered the University of Minnesota where he obtained his doctor's degree in political science in 1987. 

After university, Chu became a specially-appointed research fellow of the Institute of Political Science, Academia Sinica. He was also a professor of the Department of Politics, National Taiwan University, and executive director of Chiang Chingkuo International Academic Foundation.

Chu died of rectal cancer at home in Taipei, on 5 February 2023, at the age of 67.

Publications

Honours and awards
 2012 Member of the Academia Sinica

References

1956 births
2023 deaths 
Deaths from colorectal cancer 
Deaths from cancer in Taiwan
People from Taipei
Affiliated Senior High School of National Taiwan Normal University alumni
National Taiwan University alumni
University of Minnesota alumni
Academic staff of the National Taiwan University
Columbia University faculty
Members of Academia Sinica
Taiwanese political scientists
20th-century social scientists
21st-century social scientists